Melissa Dunphy (born 1980) is an Australian-American composer of classical music. She is most notable for the Gonzales Cantata, a 40-minute choral piece in Baroque style that sets the text of the parts of the dismissal of U.S. attorneys controversy hearings in which former Attorney General Alberto Gonzales testified. It was featured on the Rachel Maddow Show in 2009; Maddow described it as "probably the coolest thing you've ever seen on this show." Dunphy completed her doctoral degree at the University of Pennsylvania in 2014. Dunphy is the composer-in-residence for the Saint Louis Chamber Chorus, for which she has composed several a cappella choral works since her appointment in 2015.

Gonzales Cantata
Conceived while Dunphy was at West Chester University of Pennsylvania, the cantata has a libretto taken entirely from the transcript of the Gonzales hearings, which Dunphy found dramatic. Because Dunphy wished to highlight the fact that the Senate Judiciary Committee was made up entirely of men, with the exception of Dianne Feinstein - and also because there are more female opera singers than male - she reversed the genders and cast sopranos as Gonzales and as the male senators. Orrin Hatch is an alto, because he was more sympathetic to Gonzales and it needed "a different vibe"; Feinstein is a male tenor. The cantata includes an aria for Gonzales called "I Don't Recall," in which the soprano sings the title phrase 72 times, the same number of times that Gonzales said it in the hearings. Dunphy reports that she asked John Ashcroft for permission to arrange his song "Let the Eagle Soar" as a "companion piece," but he turned her down on grounds of "artistic differences."

The piece is generally Baroque in style, with some use of more modernist dissonance in the orchestration. Julian Sanchez described the cantata as "sort of like Henry Purcell filtered through late John Adams"; other reviewers mentioned its similarity to Handelian opera or to P.D.Q. Bach, or pointed out the use of "Coplandesque harmonies when characters were being folksy."

The work premiered at the Philadelphia Fringe Festival in September 2009. It was staged as a cantata or oratorio; characters wore red or blue dresses depending on party affiliation, with tiaras as well as sashes bearing their names. American Opera Theater staged the work as an opera in February 2011; reviews were less positive, with critics saying that Dunphy's parody of Baroque music compared unfavorably to P.D.Q. Bach and criticizing her out-of-period use of dissonance. Anne Midgette, criticizing the piece's lack of a coherent message, wrote, "Performed as a cantata, this piece may be an amusing diversion; staged as an opera, it reveals its dramatic deficiencies and loses some of its zany humor."

Selected other works
Black Thunder (2008) - work for baritone, violin, cello, and piano which received an honorable mention in the ASCAP/Lotte Lehmann Foundation 2009 Art Song Competition.
What do you think I fought for at Omaha Beach? (2010) - choral work to the text of public testimony by WWII veteran Philip Spooner in support of Maine's No on 1 campaign, which aimed to preserve same-sex marriage in the state. It won the 2010 Simon Carrington Chamber Singers Composition Competition.

Acting
Dunphy is also a stage actress. She has played a number of Shakespearean roles for theatre festivals and companies in Pennsylvania, where she has resided since 2003. The Philadelphia Inquirer called her "unquestionably the city's leading Shakespeare ingenue" for her performance as Ophelia in the Lantern Theater Company's Hamlet.

References

External links
Melissa Dunphy's website
The Gonzales Cantata
What do you think I fought for at Omaha Beach?

American women classical composers
American classical composers
Australian women classical composers
Australian classical composers
Australian stage actresses
Australian expatriates in the United States
Living people
1980 births
West Chester University alumni
University of Pennsylvania alumni
People from Brisbane
21st-century American women musicians